Oberkassel is a part of Düsseldorf's Borough 4. Oberkassel lies on the west side of the river Rhine, the opposite side of the central district of Düsseldorf.

Oberkassel is an economically well-situated borough with an average income of 61.465 Euro and an unemployment rate below 5%. Nearly half of the households in Oberkassel are single households. The average age is about 45 years.

History

The settlement Heerdt was first mentioned was in the 9th century CE.
1898: The Oberkassel Bridge between Düsseldorf-Heerdt and Düsseldorf was opened.
1909: Heerdt, and with Heerdt Oberkassel, became a part of Düsseldorf.
1920: Following the use of the Freikorps by the German Social Democratic Government, Oberkassel was occupied by Belgian troops.
1945: The bridge was nearly captured by American troops disguised as Germans. It was then dynamited by the retreating Wehrmacht.

In the 20th century Oberkassel became a quarter of Düsseldorf.

Modern Oberkassel

Oberkassel is a socially well-to-do part of Düsseldorf. The average age of Oberkassel's residents is 44.

A large part of Düsseldorf's Japanese population lives in Oberkassel.
There is a Japanese kindergarten and a Japanese school in Düsseldorf-Niederkassel, a neighboring district, as well as a Japanese cultural centre, the Eko-House, and a Buddhist temple.

Education

The Japanische Internationale Schule in Düsseldorf (JISD) first opened in a church building in Oberkassel on April 21, 1971, before moving to its permanent home in 1973. From 1983 to 2001 junior high school students of the JISD attended classes at the former Lanker School in Oberkassel.

Interesting buildings

 Rom.-Catholic St. Antonius Church, constructed between 1909 and 1910 by Josef Kleesattel in the Neo-romantic style
 Evangelical Resurrection Church (Auferstehungskirche), built between 1913 and 1914 by Julius Stobbe and Wilhelm Verheyen.

References

External links

 Communal Administration, District Administration (German)

Urban districts and boroughs of Düsseldorf